The Christian Martyrs' Last Prayer (French: La Dernière Prière des martyrs chrétiens), also known as The Christian Martyrs and The Last Prayer, is an 1883 painting by the French painter Jean-Léon Gérôme. It is part of the collection of the Walters Art Museum in Baltimore.

Description 
The amphitheatre is filled to overflowing with the crowd that has gathered to witness the martyrdom of the Christians. Around the vast circle, unhappy victims agonize upon the cross. In one corner of the arena, a group of men and women, condemned to die, confess their new faith in an ardent prayer, while from the opened subterraneous passage the ravenous beasts are advancing upon their human prey.

Context 

Concerning the persecution of Christians in the Roman Empire, Tacitus wrote:

History 

W. T. Walters of Baltimore commissioned this painting in 1863, but the artist did not deliver it until twenty years later. In 1883, Gérôme completed this, one of his most famous works, and sent the following letter with the canvas to its new owner:

See also 

 Nero's Torches
 Academic art

References

Sources 

 Beeny, Emily (2010). "Blood Spectacle: Gérôme in the Arena". In Allan, Scott, & Morton, Mary (eds.). Reconsidering Gérôme. Los Angeles, CA: Getty Publications. pp. 40–54.
 Gotlieb, Marc (2010). "Gérôme's Cinematic Imagination". In Allan, Scott, & Morton, Mary (eds.). Reconsidering Gérôme. Los Angeles, CA: Getty Publications. pp. 54–65.
 Hering, Fanny Field (1892). Gérôme: The Life and Works of Jean Léon Gérôme. New York, NY: Cassell Publishing Company. pp. 2, 8, 242–243.
 Jackson, John (1962). Tacitus IV: Annals, Books XIII–XVI. London: William Heinemann Ltd.; Cambridge, MA: Harvard University Press. pp. 283–285.
 Junkelmann, Marcus (2000). "Familia Gladiatoria: The Heroes of the Amphitheatre". In Köhne, Eckart & Ewigleben, Cornelia (eds.). Gladiators and Caesars: The Power of Spectacle in Ancient Rome. University of California Press. pp. 31–32.
 Keim, Albert (1912). Gérôme. Cooper, Frederic Taber (trans.). Masterpieces in Colour. New York, NY: Frederick A. Stokes Company. p. 49.
 "The Christian Martyrs' Last Prayer". The Walters Art Museum. Retrieved 5 June 2022.

1883 paintings
Paintings by Jean-Léon Gérôme
History paintings